Lakeland Senior High School is the oldest public high school in Lakeland, Florida, United States. It is part of Polk County Public Schools. Lakeland Senior High School was the original high school in the city. It also shares its campus with Lois Cowles Harrison Center for the Visual and Performing Arts. Harrison students attend academic classes at Lakeland Senior High School.

Athletics
The school's athletic teams are known as the Lakeland Dreadnaughts. Lakeland's football team has won eight state championships, in 1986, 1996, 1999, 2004, 2005, 2006, 2018 and 2022. The Dreadnaughts have played their home football games at Thomas W. Bryant Stadium since 1941. They won their inaugural game at the stadium on September 26, 1941, 33–0 over the Florida Military Academy.

Band
The Lakeland Senior High School Band was founded in 1924.

Notable alumni

 Lindsey Alley (1996), actress, cast member of The Mickey Mouse Club
 Andy Bean, professional golfer
 Ahmad Black (2007), Tampa Bay Buccaneers player
 Keon Broxton, MLB outfielder for the New York Mets
 Charles T. Canady, U. S. Congressman (1992-2000), Florida Supreme Court Chief Justice
 Lawton Chiles (1948), Governor of Florida, 1991–1998
 Ronnie Ghent (1990), NFL player
 Kay Hagan, U.S. Senator; niece of Lawton Chiles
 Arthur Hendrix, tennis player
 Allen Hunt (1982), talk radio host 
 Drew Hutchison, MLB player with Pittsburgh Pirates
 Lee Janzen, professional golfer, two-time US Open winner
 Grady Judd, Sheriff of Polk County, Florida
 Frances Langford, singer, entertainer and film actress
 Neva Jane Langley (1953), Miss America
 Josh Lucas, MLB pitcher for the Oakland Athletics
 Sona MacDonald (1979), European actress
 Aaron Marsh (Orchestra Department, Class of 1999), singer/songwriter, lead singer of Copeland
 Lauren Miller, actor and screenwriter
 Elliott Morgan (Musical Theatre Department, Class of 2005), actor, writer, producer, YouTube personality
 Karen Olivo, stage and television actor
 Wayne Peace (1980), football player
 Steve Pearce (2001), professional baseball player, 2018 World Series MVP 
 Maurkice Pouncey (2007), NFL player, Pittsburgh Steelers
 Mike Pouncey (2007), NFL player, Miami Dolphins
 Boog Powell, MLB player, two-time World Series champion, four-time All-Star, 1970 American League MVP
 Chris Rainey (2007), NFL player, Pittsburgh Steelers
 Rey Robinson, 1972 track & field Olympian, former world record holder in 100 meter sprint
 Dennis A. Ross (1977), U.S. Congressman
 Chris Sale, MLB pitcher for Boston Red Sox and Chicago White Sox, six-time All-Star
 Susan Sherouse (Orchestra Department, Class of 2001), violinist
 Rod Smart (1995), NFL player
 Park Trammell, U.S. Senator; 21st Governor of Florida

Old Lakeland High School

The Old Lakeland High School is located at 400 North Florida Avenue in Lakeland and in 1993 was added to the National Register of Historic Places. Over the years the building has housed several different schools including the Lakeland Junior High School, Polk Opportunity Center and Lakeland Middle Academy (renamed the Lawton Chiles Middle Academy in 1999).

References

External links 
 Lakeland High School
 Polk County Public Schools

High schools in Polk County, Florida
Works Progress Administration in Florida
Public high schools in Florida
Schools in Lakeland, Florida
1927 establishments in Florida
Educational institutions established in 1927